Stony Point is a town in Rockland County, New York, United States. It is part of the New York City Metropolitan Area.  The town is located north of the town of Haverstraw, east and south of Orange County, and west of the Hudson River and Westchester County.  The population was 15,059 at the 2010 census. The name of the town is derived from a prominent projection into the Hudson River.

The town is in the northeastern part of the county. U.S. Route 9W, U.S. Route 202, and the Palisades Interstate Parkway are major north-south routes through the town. Stony Point is included in the North Rockland Central School District. It is the most rural of the five towns in Rockland County.

Life in Stony Point, NY 
Stony Point, New York is a town that many call home for the suburban style vibe. The town contains numerous strip malls alongside Route 9W, which have a variety of stores and shops. Many residents frequently enjoy the events at the local library, Rose Memorial Library. It's also relatively close to the city of Nyack, New York. It's also just 40 miles north New York City.

As of 2020, the median price for a single family home was around $420,000. To rent an entire home in Stony Point, it cost between a range of $1,300-$3,000.

History 

During the American Revolution, the King's Ferry in Stony Point linked New York and the southern colonies with New England; it was used many times by General George Washington's Continental Army, and in 1781 Washington's French allies used it on their way to the Battle of Yorktown.

The economy of the town improved upon the rediscovery of limestone deposits in the 19th century. The town of Stony Point was founded in 1865 from the northern part of the town of Haverstraw.

Battle of Stony Point 
During the American Revolution, defending the area of Stony Point was crucial. Even George Washington himself prioritized keeping Stony Point, along with the areas around it safe. The importance of controlling that area was crucial to the control of West Point, which is why Washington found taking back the area so important. Washington assigned Major Henry Lee and General Anthony Wayne as the men in charge, and knew the importance of controlling the area.

Having control of Stony Point would enable Washington to have the most effective line of communication between certain colonies. The geography of the town attributed into the advantages the area had to offer. For example, the rockiness and woods made it a good place to keep watch over the Hudson River. General Wayne planned his attack accordingly, and executed the attack effectively.

Stony Point was controlled by British troops, but Washington wanted control to help take down their strong naval forces. By taking control, the Americans would gain an advantage over the British for the remainder of the war. Although it wasn't a definitive battle, it still played a major role in the outcome of the American Revolution.

During the Battle of Stony Point, there were many different sources of weaponry. One of the main ones used was a bayonet. The British soldiers relied heavily on the sword on the end of their rifles, simply because it was more effective during the battle. Although it might seem ironic that a sword can out do a firearm, but the bayonets were extremely effective if trained for it. Also, the rifles at the time of the battle had flaws, such as it being too light. General Wayne took note of this, and advised his side to stay away from the use of rifles. He encouraged the use of muskets and bayonets for the same reasoning.

One of the most unrecognized contributions of during the Battle of Stony Point, was an African-American slave named 'Pompey." At the time, Pompey realized the willingness for the American troops to go the extra mile for victory, which is why he offered to help. Part of his duties were too sell and deliver food, and he frequently spoke with British troops. After acquiring information, he then brought it over to the American troops. This enabled Wayne to attack the British when they least expected in the area of Stony Point, all because of Pompey's courageous efforts.

Geography
According to the United States Census Bureau, the town has a total area of 31.6 square miles (81.8 km2), of which 27.6 square miles (71.5 km2) is land and 4.0 square miles (10.3 km2), or 12.58%, is water.

The western town line is the border of Orange County, and the eastern town line is defined by the Hudson River, with Westchester County on the opposite shore.

Education 
The Town of Stony Point is part of the North Rockland Central School District. Students in Stony Point have a plethora of educational opportunities. The district conducts schooling from kindergarten though 5th grade, 6th grade through 8th grade, and finally 9th grade through 12th grade. The town also attains a private Catholic School, Immaculate Conception School, which conducts schooling from kindergarten through grade 8. The average total SAT score is over 1000 for students in the town.

Demographics

As of the census of 2000, there were 14,245 people, 4,832 households, and 3,802 families residing in the town.  The population density was 511.7 people per square mile (197.5/km2).  There were 4,951 housing units at an average density of 177.9 per square mile (68.7/km2).  The racial makeup of the town was 94.33% white, 1.27% Black or African American, 0.19% Native American, 1.29% Asian, 0.02% Pacific Islander, 1.66% from other races, and 1.24% from two or more races. Hispanic or Latino of any race were 6.84% of the population.

There were 4,832 households, out of which 38.0% had children under the age of 18 living with them, 66.2% were married couples living together, 9.1% had a female householder with no husband present, and 21.3% were non-families. 17.3% of all households were made up of individuals, and 8.1% had someone living alone who was 65 years of age or older.  The average household size was 2.92 and the average family size was 3.33. 
In the town, the population was spread out, with 26.1% under the age of 18, 6.6% from 18 to 24, 30.6% from 25 to 44, 24.9% from 45 to 64, and 11.8% who were 65 years of age or older.  The median age was 38 years. For every 100 females, there were 97.8 males.  For every 100 females age 18 and over, there were 94.0 males.

The median income for a household in the town was $71,940, and according to CNN the median income for a family was $97,633. Males had a median income of $55,727 versus $36,424 for females. The per capita income for the town was $28,244. In comparison, the average salary in 2010 for a full-time Stony Point police officer was $126,895.  About 1.9% of families and 3.7% of the population were below the poverty line, including 2.4% of those under age 18 and 10.7% of those age 65 or over.

As of the 2020 Census, there were 14,813 people residing in the Town of Stony Point.

Communities and locations in Stony Point
Bear Mountain—a hamlet in the northern part of the town and named after a peak in the Bear Mountain State Park.
Bulsontown—a hamlet in the northwestern part of the town.
Cedar Flats—a hamlet northwest of Stony Point hamlet.
Doodletown—a hamlet in the northern corner of the town, in Bear Mountain State Park, abandoned since 1965.
Grassy Point—a hamlet.
Grassy Point—a short peninsula into the Hudson River in the southeastern part of the town. William Denning Sr., a wealthy New York lawyer, sold  at the southern end of the property to another New York lawyer, William Smith, who built Rosa Villa, his country estate. William's brother, Doctor Thomas Smith, was the owner of the "treason house" in West Haverstraw, New York that was occupied by his other brother, Joshua Hett Smith, at the time that Benedict Arnold and Major John André planned their conspiracies during the American Revolution.
Jones Point—a hamlet by the Hudson River. It is the easternmost community in the town.
Stony Point—the hamlet and CDP of Stony Point is in the eastern part of the town.
Tomkins Cove—a hamlet by the Hudson River, just north of the Town of Stony Point. 
Willow Grove—a hamlet on the southern town line. Willow Grove includes Jessup Valley, a small community surrounding Jessup Lake, just west of the Palisades Interstate Parkway.

Transportation 

The ex-New York Central's River Subdivision follows the west bank of the Hudson River through Stony Point. The line is now operated by CSX Transportation, the fourth railroad to operate the line. The only company served by CSX in the town is the Mirant Lovett Generating Station, which receives trainloads of coal approximately once per week. The power station owns and operates its own railroad to bring the coal from the siding at milepost (MP) 38 into the plant. A talking defect detector, which scans the axles of passing trains for problems, is located in Stony Point. On average, between 20–25 trains pass through Stony Point per day. CSX runs six container stack trains a day. Once per week, a garbage train from the Bronx brings trash up north to burn for power. On a normal day on the River Line, one will see mostly manifest freight trains and tankers. The Auto Rack express brings cars to their owners in either New Jersey or northern New York. CSX trains run five to fifteen minutes apart. The longest wait is mostly one hour. There are only two trestles in Stony Point.

The Palisades Interstate Parkway passes through the town.

Tourism

Historical markers

Buckberg Mountain, 112 Buckberg Mountain Road
Site of King's Ferry, Route 9W & Park Road – at Stony Point, just north of Stony Point Battlefield. An important river crossing for American troops and supplies during the Revolution, as it was a link between New England and the states to the south; thus the importance of capturing Stony Point from the British in 1779.
Site of Springsteel Farm House 1779, 16A Franck Road
Washington Wayne Lookout
Wilson H. Young Memorial Bridge, East Main Street
Site of Springsteel Farm House 1779, 16A Franck Road
Stony Point Battlefield, Route 9W & Park Road
The First Road, 117 W. Main Street
Gilmor Sloane House – The building was put together by Benjiman F. Goodspeed. When he was creating the building in 1856, the structure stemmed from French Renaissance architecture.

Landmarks and places of interest

Berlin Wall segment outside the Stony Point Justice Court
Gilmor Sloane House – 17 Crickettown Rd. An 1856 Victorian mansion with no televisions or telephones. An 1888 Barn Playhouse (Penguin Rep) on grounds.
Harriman State Park – A large state park partly in the western part of the town.
Iona Island and Marsh – Between Jones Point and Bear Mountain. It was previously called "Weyants Island".
Patriot Hills Golf Club – Ranked 20th Best Public Golf Course in New York 2010 by Golf Magazine
Pyngyp School - (NRHP)
Stony Point Battlefield – A state historic site, off Route 9W, Stony Point – Occupied by the British in 1779. (NRHP)
Stony Point Light –  In the 1800's and early 1900's the Hudson River Lighthouses allowed ships to travel safely through the waters. This was crucial as the Hudson River is one of the largest rivers in New York State. The Hudson River stretched from New York City, New York, all the way up to Albany, New York. The large river attained a total of 13 lighthouses in its route, and Stony Point opened theirs in 1826. The lighthouse is located on the Stony Point Battlefield, and is still open for tourists to view.
William H. Rose House (NRHP)

Notable people
 John Cage (1912–1992), composer, lived in Stony Point during the 1950s and 60s
 Stephanie Courtney (1970–), actress and comedian who was born in Stony Point
 James Farley (1888–1976), Postmaster General, Chairman of the Democratic National Committee
 Richard Humann (1961–), conceptual artist, born and raised in Stony Point until age 18
 Jasper Johns (1930–), artist, lived in Stony Point during the 1980s and 1990s
 Danielle McEwan (1991–), ten-pin bowler and PWBA title holder
 Mitch Miller (1911–2010), musician and record producer; owned a house in Stony Point now inhabited by his daughter
 Eugene Palmer (1939–), murderer and fugitive
 Roy Pea (1952–), learning scientist, technology innovator, and Stanford University professor
 Katelyn Tuohy (2002-) Middle and long distance runner. Four-time NCAA champion and holds the national women's high school mile record at 4:33.29.
 Stan Vanderbeek (1927–1984), independent filmmaker; built his Movie Drome theater in Stony Point
 General "Mad" Anthony Wayne (1745–1796), United States Army officer, statesmen, member of United States House of Representatives, may have earned his nickname "Mad" at the Battle of Stony Point during the Revolutionary War

List of schools

 North Rockland High School 
 Fieldstone Middle School
 Willow Grove Upper Elementary School
 Farley Upper Elementary School
 Haverstraw Upper Elementary School
 Thiells Elementary School
 West Haverstraw Elementary School
 Stony Point Elementary School

References

External links
 Historical Markers and War Memorials in Stony Point, New York

 
 

Towns in Rockland County, New York
New York (state) populated places on the Hudson River